Madrone is a vernacular name for plants of the genus Arbutus. 

Madrone may also refer to:

 Madrone, California, a neighborhood in Silicon Valley
 Madrone, New Mexico, a census-designed place
 Madrone butterfly
 Madrone shield bearer, a moth
 Madrone (band), an American alternative rock band

See also
 Madrona (disambiguation)